Maurice James Mullane (1924–2008) was an Australian rugby league footballer who played in the 1940s and 1950s.

Playing career
'Mick' Mullane started his career at Newtown just after he returned from war service. He played four years of first grade with the Bluebags and represented N.S.W. in 1950. He moved to the St. George club in 1951, but suffered a season ending leg injury in a trial game. The turned out for the Saints the following year before retiring at the conclusion of the 1953 season.

'Mick' Mullane was the father of Mick Mullane Jr. and Greg Mullane, both first grade rugby league players in the 1970s.

Death
Maurice James 'Mick' Mullane died in Sydney on 13 April 2008, 40 days short of his 84th birthday.

References

1924 births
2008 deaths
Australian military personnel of World War II
Australian rugby league players
St. George Dragons players
Newtown Jets players
New South Wales rugby league team players
Rugby league players from Sydney
Rugby league centres